Clibborn is a surname. Notable people with the surname include:

 Arthur Booth-Clibborn (1855–1939), Salvation Army officer in France and Switzerland
 Stanley Booth-Clibborn (1924–1996), British Anglican bishop
 John Clibborn (1941–2017), MI6 spy
 Judy Clibborn, American politician